Inlet Square Mall is a  single-level regional shopping center in Murrells Inlet, South Carolina, United States. Belk is the last major anchor with junior anchor Planet Fitness and with two vacant major anchors last occupied by Kmart, JCPenney, and vacant junior anchors last occupied by Stein Mart and Books-A-Million.

After the opening of a Walmart Supercenter in Garden City, Kmart closed in late April 2014. On January 7, 2015, it was announced that one of the mall's two main anchor stores, JCPenney, would be closing in March of that year. A Planet Fitness opened in place of the former Ladies Choice fitness center in May 2015. The mall's Stein Mart location closed in September due to Urban retail not working with them to try extending their 2015 lease at Inlet Square. 2015 so Urban Retail let Steinmart leave to can relocate to the South Strand Commons shopping center near Surfside Beach, the new location opened in October 2015.

History
Inlet Square was built in 1990 by CBL Properties. It was the area's largest mall, slightly larger than the now demolished Myrtle Square Mall. The mall was bought in the early 2000s. It was originally going to be redesigned similarly to the successful Broadway at the Beach. With those plans falling through, a $4.5 million remodeling project began in 2007. This was the first renovation in the mall's history, and had been much needed since the massive 1.3 million square-foot Coastal Grand Mall opened in 2004.  The renovations weren't complete until 2011 due to financial hardships and loss of foot traffic. During this time, the mall lost most of its long time tenants, including the 12-screen Regal Cinemas, in 2010. In 2011, Franks Cinebowl and Grill opened a new complex in the former Regal Cinemas, bringing new life to the mall. In 2014, the mall lost Kmart, which opened with the original mall in 1990, and also gained a Planet Fitness location in the former Ladies Choice location. In 2015, the mall was hit with two more tenant losses, with the closures of JC Penney and Stein Mart. This leaves Belk, Planet Fitness, and Books-A-Million as the only stores left in the mall.

On October 13, 2013, the owners of Inlet Square Mall, Murrells Retail Associates, a fictitious name under parent Company, RAIT Financial Trust, sued Frank Theaters for failing to make lease payments on time on several occasions. The theater chain owed the mall $201,363 in unpaid rent and is asking a judge to accelerate nearly $24 million worth of payments which is due under a 20-year lease agreement that was signed in 2011. The Frank Theaters and CineBowl that were located in the Inlet Square closed suddenly at midnight on May 14, 2016 with no notice to the public after being in business for five years.

On March 31, 2018, RAIT Financial Trust defaulted on its lease by not paying their five year Overage Payment of $328,000 to the landlord. RAIT refused to pay the landlord its monthly rent of $45,000 in June, July, August and September. The landlord hired a litigation attorney immediately since RAIT was pocketing all the tenant rents. During this time of waiting on a rule by the SC judge, RAIT remained in Inlet Square Mall now owing four months rent to the landlord. The landlord won in court and a court summons was ruled for RAIT to be evicted, September 30,2018, even though RAIT FINANCIAL TRUST Mall said they left voluntarily. RAIT was never planning to leave voluntarily and would have continued to not pay rents while keeping all the income if not for their eviction. See Horry County court records as proof.  No citation needed. 

On May 13 2020, WBTW News reported that Books-A-Million had closed.

Current tenants
 Belk
 Planet Fitness

Reconstruction
F + F Development began reconstruction on the mall in 2012 in an attempt to make it similar to the popular outdoor shopping center Broadway at the Beach.  The construction caused F + F Development to go into bankruptcy, and RAIT Financial Trust took over the collateral as ownership and operators of Inlet Square Mall due toF & F Development default on the large Loan owed to Rait Financial Trust. Although managed by Urban retail later years, RAIT Financial Trust was always the actual owner until they stopped paying rent to their landlord, West C Street Holdings, LLC as of June 2018 for 4 months until evicted.  But all 4 months RAIT Financial Trust pocketed all the mall rent, kept all the tenants Security Deposits ( $11,760) with the excuse of "we spent it" and RAIT skipped out on paying their share of 9 months occupying the building for  2018 Horry County Property Taxes($127,000).  All of this totaled $627k loss for West C Street Holdings, LLC in which in 2020 the motion ruled in Horry County Court as RAIT Financial Trust Attorney, Robert Jordan, admitted they currently owe West C Street Holdings $510,870.60 and understands this confession does not end the case and will continue whether RAIT regroups through Bankruptcy or not - there's still money in their hands. West C Street was forced to take over the operations of the mall after RAIT Financial Trust had let the mall fail by losing many tenants since they did not know how to operate a mall and this was further financial damage to West C Street and the mall.

References

External links
 Deadmalls

Shopping malls in South Carolina
Shopping malls in Horry County, South Carolina
Shopping malls established in 1990